Ellen Kjellberg (born 10 January 1948) is a Norwegian dancer. She was born in Oslo, a daughter of art historian and museologist Reidar Kjellberg. She was among the leading dancers at the Norwegian National Opera and Ballet in the 1960s and 1970s. A bronze sculpture of Kjellberg, modelled by Nina Sundbye in 1996, is located at the Norwegian National Opera and Ballet in Oslo. She was appointed Professor at the Oslo National Academy of the Arts from 2007.

References

1948 births
Living people
Entertainers from Oslo
Norwegian ballerinas